Beinn Eilideach (mountain of hinds) is a mountain near Ullapool in Ross-shire in the Scottish Highlands. It is 559 metres high, and listed as a Marilyn. It has a triangulation pillar near the summit, though the highest point is actually 100 metre away to the west of this.

References

Mountains and hills of the Northwest Highlands
Marilyns of Scotland